Lumusa Rural LLG is a local-level government (LLG) of Western Highlands Province, Papua New Guinea.

Lumusa (Lumis) used to be part of Enga Province.

Wards
01. Lai.1
02. Rombau
03. Mondaiyanda
04. Laiyakama.2
05. Nekerapa.1
06. Negarada 2
07. Negerapa.3
08. Pinyapaisa.1
09. Pinapaisa.2
10. Mano
11. Minigiwa
12. Wangumali
13. Kumbakosa.1
14. Kumbakosa.2
15. Yangomanda
16. Sinjumanda
17. Jikama
18. Kunjilama
19. Kakemali.1
20. Kakemali.2
21. Kakemali.3
22. Keimanda
23. Kugu/Kumasina
24. Ipiylisina Kumasina 2
25. Indiypendent/Kumasina 3

References

Local-level governments of Western Highlands Province